Odonaspidini is a tribe of armored scale insects.

Genera
Berlesaspidiotus
Circulaspis
Dicirculaspis
Froggattiella
Leonardianna
Odonaspis

References

Aspidiotinae
Hemiptera tribes